Saurabh Meher (born 12 January 2000) is an Indian professional footballer who plays as a defender for Odisha FC in the Indian Super League.

Career
Saurabh was part of the India U-16 team which finished runners-up in the 2015 SAFF U-16 Championship, losing to Bangladesh U16 in the final on penalties.
Saurabh was part of the AIFF Elite Academy batch that was preparing for the 2017 FIFA U-17 World Cup to be hosted in India. He made his professional debut for the side in the Arrow's first match of the 2019-20 season against Gokulam Kerala F.C. He started and played full match as Indian Arrows central defender and lost 0–1. Meher plays primarily in the heart of defence but can also slot in as a make-shift wing-back. Previously in the year 2018 he captained Chennayin FC B Team and Youth (U-18) team in I- League 2nd Division and Hero Elite League, where he led his team up to the semi finals. He was also the part of India U-15 National team which played the SAFF U-16 Championship in 2015 Bangladesh.
He was the Golden Boot Winner in SAFF U-16 Championship in 2015 edition.
Saurabh Meher played as a central defender under Shanmugam Venkatesh in Hero I-League 2019-20 season and appeared eight times, spending a total of 649 minutes on the field.

Odisha FC
On 5 June 2020, Saurabh signed for Odisha FC on a long-term deal.

Career statistics

References

2000 births
Living people
Indian footballers
Indian Arrows players
Footballers from Mumbai
I-League players
India youth international footballers
Association football fullbacks
AIFF Elite Academy players
Chennaiyin FC B players
Indian Super League players
Odisha FC players